The Samoa national badminton team represents Samoa in international badminton team competitions and is controlled by the Samoa Badminton Association located in Apia. It is associated with Badminton Oceania.

The Samoan team competed in the 2019 Oceania Badminton Championships. The mixed team finished in 7th place.

Participation in Oceania Badminton Championships

Mixed team

Current squad 
The following players were selected to represent Samoa at the 2019 Oceania Badminton Championships.

Male players
Aukuso Samuelu Sue
Hilton Soo
Kennedy Simanu
Tupu Fua

Female players
Folole Ioane
Lizzie Caffarelli

References

Badminton
National badminton teams
Badminton in Samoa